Xu Jing (born 8 January 1968 in Liaoning) is a Chinese-born table tennis player who represented Chinese Taipei at the 1996 Summer Olympics and 2000 Summer Olympics. She also won a bronze medal at the 1994 Asian Games and a bronze medal at the 1998 Asian Games.

In the 1990s she was considered the second-best Taiwanese female player after Chen Jing (also born and raised in P.R. China). Together they won silver at the 2000 World Team Table Tennis Championships, which was Taiwan's best finish.

She has been coaching in mainland China in recent years.

References

1968 births
Living people
Chinese female table tennis players
Taiwanese female table tennis players
Olympic table tennis players of Taiwan
Table tennis players at the 1996 Summer Olympics
Table tennis players at the 2000 Summer Olympics
Asian Games medalists in table tennis
Table tennis players at the 1994 Asian Games
Table tennis players at the 1998 Asian Games
Medalists at the 1994 Asian Games
Medalists at the 1998 Asian Games
Asian Games silver medalists for Chinese Taipei
Asian Games bronze medalists for Chinese Taipei
Taiwanese people from Liaoning
Table tennis players from Liaoning
Naturalised table tennis players
20th-century Taiwanese women